In Greek mythology, Epidamnus (Ancient Greek: Ἐπίδαμνος  Epídamnos) father of Melissa who became the mother of Dyrrhachius by the sea-god Poseidon. The town of Dyrrhachium in Illyria which was formerly called Epidamnus derived its name from him.

Notes

References 
 Stephanus of Byzantium, Stephani Byzantii Ethnicorum quae supersunt, edited by August Meineike (1790-1870), published 1849. A few entries from this important ancient handbook of place names have been translated by Brady Kiesling. Online version at the Topos Text Project.

Kings in Greek mythology
Mythological city founders